Typhlonesticus is a genus of scaffold web spiders first described by Władysław Kulczyński in 1914. , it contains only five European species.

References

Nesticidae
Araneomorphae genera